{{DISPLAYTITLE:C4H9Li}}
The molecular formula C4H9Li (molar mass: 64.06 g/mol) may refer to:

 n-Butyllithium
 sec-Butyllithium
 tert-Butyllithium

Molecular formulas